Marek Skála (born 25 October 1989 in Prague) is a Czech freestyle skier.
He competed in slopestyle at the FIS Freestyle World Ski Championships 2013. He competed at the 2014 Winter Olympics in Sochi, in slopestyle.

References

External links

1989 births
Living people
Freestyle skiers at the 2014 Winter Olympics
Czech male freestyle skiers
Olympic freestyle skiers of the Czech Republic
Sportspeople from Prague